Şuduq (also, Shudug and Shudukh) is a village and municipality in the Quba Rayon of Azerbaijan.  It has a population of 428.

References 

Populated places in Quba District (Azerbaijan)